Darling Downs was an electoral district of the Legislative Assembly in the Australian state of New South Wales from July 1859 to December 1859, representing the Darling Downs, prior to the Separation of Queensland. It elected two members simultaneously, with voters having two votes each.

Members for Darling Downs

Election results

Elections in the 1850s

1859

References

Darling Downs
Darling Downs
History of Queensland
Darling Downs
1859 establishments in Australia
1859 disestablishments in Australia
Constituencies established in 1859
Constituencies disestablished in 1859